Lauzach is a commune in the Morbihan department of Brittany in north-western France. Inhabitants of Lauzach are called in French Lauzachois.

See also
Communes of the Morbihan department

References

External links
 Mayors of Morbihan Association 

Communes of Morbihan